Doug Faulkner is a Canadian politician, who served as mayor of the Regional Municipality of Wood Buffalo, Alberta from 1997 to 2004.

Born in Scotland and raised in Bishops Falls, Newfoundland and Labrador, Faulkner worked in the materials and services department for Syncrude prior to his election as mayor.

Faulkner has also run for federal and provincial office. He ran as a Progressive Conservative candidate in Athabasca in the 2000 election, but switched his affiliation to the Liberal Party in the 2004 election following the merger of the Progressive Conservatives and the Canadian Alliance into the contemporary Conservative Party. In the 2012 provincial election in Alberta, he ran as a Wildrose Party candidate in the electoral district of Fort McMurray-Conklin.

Electoral record

References

Mayors of places in Alberta
Living people
People from Fort McMurray
Candidates in the 2004 Canadian federal election
Wildrose Party candidates in Alberta provincial elections
Liberal Party of Canada candidates for the Canadian House of Commons
Progressive Conservative Party of Canada candidates for the Canadian House of Commons
Candidates in the 2000 Canadian federal election
Year of birth missing (living people)